Antoni Cejzik (15 May 1900 – 12 September 1939) was a Polish athlete. He moved to Poland in 1924 as an eight-time Soviet champion in various athletics competitions and the Soviet record holder in decathlon.

Cejzik competed in the men's decathlon at the 1924 Summer Olympics and the 1928 Summer Olympics. He was killed in action during World War II.

References

External links
 

1900 births
1939 deaths
People from Yelets
People from Yeletsky Uyezd
People from the Russian Empire of Polish descent
Soviet people of Polish descent
Soviet emigrants to Poland
Soviet male discus throwers
Soviet male shot putters
Soviet male sprinters
Soviet decathletes
Soviet Athletics Championships winners
Polish male sprinters
Polish male hurdlers
Polish male discus throwers
Polish male shot putters
Polish male hammer throwers
Polish male triple jumpers
Polish male high jumpers
Polish decathletes
Olympic athletes of Poland
Olympic decathletes
Athletes (track and field) at the 1924 Summer Olympics
Athletes (track and field) at the 1928 Summer Olympics
Polish military personnel killed in World War II
Recipients of the Silver Cross of Merit (Poland)